Derek Tai-Ching Kan (born August 15, 1978) is an American business executive and government official who has served as a Governor of the United States Postal Service since 2022. He served as deputy director of the Office of Management and Budget between July to December 2020. Kan also served as the under secretary of transportation for policy from 2017 to 2019.

Career 
Prior to assuming his Transportation Department position, he was the general manager of the Southern California region for Lyft. In 2015, he was nominated by President Barack Obama to be a board member of Amtrak, a position for which he was unanimously confirmed by the  U.S. Senate. In April 2017, Kan was nominated by President Donald Trump to become under secretary of transportation for policy in the United States Department of Transportation. He was confirmed by the U.S. Senate on November 13, 2017.

Kan previously worked as director of strategy at Genapsys, a biotech startup in Silicon Valley, as a management consultant at Bain & Company, as an advisor at Elliott Management Corporation, as a policy adviser to Senate Majority Leader Mitch McConnell, and as chief economist for the Senate Republican Policy Committee. He was a Presidential Management Fellow at the Office of Management and Budget.

The Trump administration briefly considered Kan for a Federal Reserve position. In July 2019, Kan resigned from his position in the Department of Transportation to take on the position of executive associate director at the Office of Management and Budget.

In July 2020, Kan was confirmed by the Senate to become to deputy director of the Office of Management and Budget. He left the position in December 2020.

In November 2021, President Biden announced he would appoint Kan to the Board of Governors of the United States Postal Service. On May 12, 2022, his nomination was confirmed in the United States Senate by voice vote.

References

1978 births
Living people
21st-century American businesspeople
Alumni of the London School of Economics
American politicians of Chinese descent
Amtrak people
Bain & Company employees
Deputy Directors for Management of the Office of Management and Budget
Lyft people
Obama administration personnel
People from Los Angeles
Stanford Graduate School of Business alumni
Trump administration personnel
United States Department of Transportation officials
University of Southern California alumni